Leonid Simanovsky (July 19, 1949, Krasnoyarsk) is a Russian political figure, deputy of the 7th, and 8th State Dumas. 

From 1996 to 2001, Simanovsky was a vice-president of the Yukos oil company. In 2000, he founded and headed the company "Khimpromindustriya". In 2003, 2007, 2011, 2016, and 2021, he was elected deputy of the 5th, 6th, 7th, and 8th State Dumas, respectively.

In 2021, Simanovsky was 85th on the Forbes list of 200 wealthiest Russian businessmen. 

He is one of the members of the State Duma the United States Treasury sanctioned on 24 March 2022 in response to the 2022 Russian invasion of Ukraine.

References

1958 births
Living people
United Russia politicians
21st-century Russian politicians
Eighth convocation members of the State Duma (Russian Federation)
Seventh convocation members of the State Duma (Russian Federation)
Sixth convocation members of the State Duma (Russian Federation)
Fifth convocation members of the State Duma (Russian Federation)
Russian individuals subject to the U.S. Department of the Treasury sanctions